Navan (meaning "the Cave") is the county town of County Meath, Ireland. In 2016, it had a population of 30,173, making it the tenth largest settlement in Ireland. It is at the confluence of the River Boyne and Blackwater, around 50 km northwest of Dublin.

History and name

Navan is a Norman foundation: Hugh de Lacy, who was granted the Lordship of Meath in 1172, awarded the Barony of Navan to one of his knights, Jocelyn de Angulo, who built a fort there, from which the town developed.

Inside the town walls, Navan consisted of three streets. These were Trimgate Street, Watergate St. and Ludlow St. (which was once called Dublingate St.).

The orientation of the three original streets remains from the Middle Ages but the buildings date from the Victorian and Edwardian periods. The town's Post Office on Trimgate Street office was built in 1908 on the site of an earlier post office. In 1990, the post office was relocated to Kennedy Road. The building of a new shopping centre re-oriented the town's centre. The onetime post office was acquired as the site of the town's first McDonald's restaurant.

Variants of Navan had been in use since Norman times. It is thought to come , a variant of its more common Irish name an Uaimh. In 1922, when the Irish Free State was founded, an Uaimh was adopted as the town's only official name. However, it failed to gain popularity in Irish and in 1971 the name was reverted to Navan in English.

Bus transport
Navan is served by several bus routes. The town has no central bus station; there are four separate stops in the town, with different routes serving each (Market Square, Mercy Convent, Shopping Centre and Fire Station). The majority of routes are operated by Bus Éireann. The most frequent route is the 109 to Dublin, which departs from Abbey Road.

Sillan also serve the town. Royal Breffni Tours provide services to Dundalk Institute of Technology. Streamline Coaches provide services to NUI Maynooth.

Education

Navan has a number of secondary schools, including private denominational and public inter-denominational and non-denominational. St. Patrick's Classical School is a Roman Catholic boys-only school. Loreto Secondary School, St. Michael's at the Loreto Convent, and St. Joseph's Secondary School at the Mercy Convent are both girls-only Roman Catholic convent schools. Coláiste na Mí is a VEC-run school in Johnstown that opened in 2013. Beaufort College is a large state-owned inter-denominational vocational school. The Abylity Secondary College was a parent-owned fee-paying non-denominational school.

Navan and the surrounding area has a number of primary schools, including the town's Catholic boys' primary school Scoil Mhuire, which was originally run by the De La Salle Brothers. Pierce Brosnan was a former pupil of St. Anne's Loreto, which is situated beside St. Mary's Catholic Church and near to St. Joseph's Mercy. There are also St. Paul's, St. Ultan's, and St. Oliver's primary schools. Scoil Éanna is the town's only gaelscoil. The town's only Church of Ireland secondary school, Preston School, closed in the 1970s. It is now the site of the shopping centre in the town. There is a Church of Ireland primary school known as Flowerfield School, on the Trim rd a new site. It was originally situated at the Flowerfield area of the town, on the main thoroughfare to Drogheda, in a building that has been sympathetically converted into private accommodation. There is also a multi-denominational Educate Together primary school in the town, sited at Commons Road.

Sport

Páirc Tailteann is located in Navan and is home of the Meath Gaelic football and Navan Hibernians GAC Hurling teams.

Navan R.F.C. won over 186 trophies in the 1960s and currently compete in the All Ireland League (AIL) Division 1B

Knockharley Cricket Club was founded in 1982 and are the only cricket club in County Meath competing in the Leinster Cricket Union, the club's most recent success came in 2006 when the 1st XI won the Middle 2 Leinster Cup defeating Mullingar at North Kildare.

Parkvilla Football Club was founded in 1966 and currently plays in North East Football league Premier Division and their reserve team competes in Division 3B.

Public art
Public art and sculptures in Navan include Sniomh, by Betty Newman Maguire, which sits in front of Navan Fire Station. This sculpture is reputedly inspired by the movement of water and the merging of the rivers Boyne and Blackwater.

Another public sculpture, The Fifth Province by Richard King, is located on the Navan Bypass. This sculpture is composed of four branches and a central upright stem that symbolises the flowering of hope and peace.

The Bull, designed by sculptor Colin Grehan, is a prominent piece of public art. Situated in the market square of the town, this is a 16 tonne limestone statue of a bull being held back by two handlers and commemorates the historic bull markets that took place in the area. The statue was surrounded by controversy over its cost, an estimated €8.7 million, and its location. Local man Paddy Pryle noted that "anybody coming up Timmons Hill, which is one of the main entrances into the town, will be entering Navan via the bull's arse. It is one of the most crazy things I have seen put up yet," Objections to the statue delayed its erection by 8 years.

Folklore 
According to local folklore a Souterrain was discovered near the Navan Viaduct in 1848. The location of its entrance has since been lost.

Another folk tale involves the ghost of Francis Ledwidge. According to the story an old friend of Ludwidge was working at the Meath Chronicle, the local news printer, when he heard the sound of Ledwidge's motorcycle outside. His friend was confused as he believed Ledwidge was fighting on the Western Front, upon going out to greet him the friend found that Ledwidge had disappeared. The story claims that this ghostly apparition appeared at the same moment he died.

In the Fenian cycle of Irish mythology, Fionn mac Cumhaill studied under the druid Finegas along the river Boyne. He is believed to have caught the Salmon of Knowledge in what is now Navan.

Twinning

Navan is twinned with the following places:
Bobbio, Italy 
Broccostella, Italy

People

Francis Beaufort, scientist and naval officer
Pierce Brosnan, actor
Enda Caldwell, radio personality
Shane Cassells, Fianna Fáil politician
Ian Clarke, computer scientist
Keith Donegan, racing driver
Simon Fagan, musician
Anthony Holten, author
Donal Keogan, Gaelic footballer
Gráinne Maguire, stand-up comedian, writer and podcaster
Arthur Mathews, comedy writer
 Conor Nash, Australian Rules Footballer 
Helen McEntee, Fine Gael politician
Dylan Moran, comedian
John O'Callaghan, DJ
Hector Ó hEochagáin, TV personality
Joseph Rooney, Catholic priest
Tommy Tiernan, comedian
Paul Tighe, Catholic prelate
Yemi Adenuga, TV personality and Ireland's first black female elected Councillor

See also 
 List of towns and villages in Ireland
List of palindromic places

References

External links 

 Historical Society of Navan website

 
County towns in the Republic of Ireland
Towns and villages in County Meath